Hanspeter Würmli (now Hans Peter Würmli, born 8 January 1953 in St. Gallen) is a Swiss former freestyle swimmer. He competed in two events at the 1972 Summer Olympics.

In 1973, he completed his swimming career and began studying for a degree in Mathematics, later receiving a PhD from ETH in Zurich. His professional career was spent mostly with Swiss Re, a Swiss reinsurance company.

References

External links
 
Hans Peter Würmli's personal website https://gusanito.ch 

1953 births
Living people
Swiss male freestyle swimmers
Olympic swimmers of Switzerland
Swimmers at the 1972 Summer Olympics
Place of birth missing (living people)
20th-century Swiss people